Rhizopus is a genus of common saprophytic fungi on plants and  specialized parasites on animals. They are found in a wide variety of organic substances, including "mature fruits and vegetables", jellies, syrups, leather, bread, peanuts, and tobacco. They are multicellular. Some Rhizopus species are opportunistic human pathogens that often cause fatal disease called mucormycosis. This widespread genus includes at least eight species.

Rhizopus species grow as filamentous, branching hyphae that generally lack cross-walls (i.e., they are coenocytic). They reproduce by forming asexual and sexual spores. In asexual reproduction, sporangiospores are produced inside a spherical structure, the sporangium. Sporangia are supported by a large apophysate columella atop a long stalk, the sporangiophore. Sporangiophores arise among distinctive, root-like rhizoids. In sexual reproduction, a dark zygospore is produced at the point where two compatible mycelia fuse. Upon germination, a zygospore produces colonies that are genetically different from either parent.

Rhizopus oligosporus is used to make tempeh, a fermented food derived from soybeans.
Rhizopus oryzae is used in the production of alcoholic beverages in parts of Asia and Africa.
Rhizopus stolonifer (black bread mold) causes fruit rot on strawberry, tomato, and sweet potato and used in commercial production of fumaric acid and cortisone.

Various species, including R. stolonifer, may cause soft rot in sweet potatoes and Narcissus.

Rhizopus helps in nutrient development since this species is grown in soil it ferments the fruits and vegetable in the soil inhibiting the growth and develops certain pathogens that inhibits the growth of toxigenic fungus. In addition to that, there is even a type of Rhizopus (Rhizopus microsporus-fermented soybean tempe) that has proven to reduce colon carcinogenesis in rats by elevating factors of mucins, immunoglobulin A, and organic acids and give protection to piglets from Escherichia coli-infection by inhibiting adhesion to the intestinal membranes. 

Phylogeny
 The mating analysis has also been found which was comparative that this species structure is flexible in comparison with other species in the same genus. The topology length of the species genome is found to be three times bigger with the species.

Species

See also
Black bread mold
Mucormycosis

References

External links
Rhizopus at Zygomycetes.org
Photos of Rhizopus spp. used for tempeh-making at www.tempeh.idv.tw

Mucoraceae
Zygomycota genera
Taxa named by Christian Gottfried Ehrenberg